Vinnie Pergola (born December 9, 1989) is an American actor. Credits to date include That's So Raven, Huff, Complete Savages, The Bernie Mac Show, Still Standing, and Miss Behave.

Music career
Since 2013, Pergola has been one half of the electronic music duo Phantoms, the other half being Kyle Kaplan. Their self titled debut album was released in March 2017.

Phantoms are best known for their collab with Vanessa Hudgens for the song Lay With Me released in 2018. Vinnie's band has also released songs such as, but not limited to, Just A Feeling, Broken Halo, Won't Be Here Forever, and Are You Up.
Phantoms released their second album, Designs For You in the summer of 2019.

External links

1989 births
Male actors from California
American male child actors
American male television actors
Living people
People from Tarzana, Los Angeles